Black Lungs is a side project of Alexisonfire's guitarist and vocalist, and current Gallows frontman Wade MacNeil. MacNeil created the side project similar to his first punk rock band Plan 9, a more relaxed and melodic sound than Alexisonfire.

History
MacNeil initiated Black Lungs with original members percussionist Jordan Hastings, keyboardists Sammi Bogdanski, and Alexisonfire's George Pettit on bass. The side project released their first studio album, Send Flowers, in May, 2008 on Dine Alone Records with Ian Romano on drums.  The band toured afterwards to support the album with Liam Cormier on drums.  Bedouin Soundclash's former drummer, Pat Pengelly later drummed with the band.

In 2008, Black Lung released a limited edition 7-inch vinyl with two songs. A second two-song 7-inch vinyl entitled Valley of the Dolls was released, through Deranged Records. in 2010. On March 8, 2011, Wade announced a Split EP with fellow Canadians, Cancer Bats.

In 2011, Black Lungs began recording their second album with producer Nick Blagona. After recording the album, titled Pagan Holiday, it was shelved for over four years and released online for free on Halloween of 2015.

Band members
Current members
Wade MacNeil - lead vocals, lead guitars & bass (2005–present)
Phil Waring - bass (2009–present)
Scott Savarie - rhythm guitar (2011–present)
George Clark - drums, percussion (2011–present)

Former members
George Pettit - rhythm guitar, backing vocals (2005–2006, 2008–2009)
Jordan "Ratbeard" Hastings - drums, percussion (2005–2006)
Sean "Sickboy" McNab - bass (2005–2006)
Liam Cormier - drums, percussion (2008)
Haris Cehajic - keyboards, piano (2008–2009)
Sammi Bogdanski - keyboards, piano (2008)
Ian Romano - drums, percussion (2008)
Pat Pengelly - drums, percussion (2008–2011)

Discography
Send Flowers (2008)
7-inch EP (June 2008)
Valley of the Dolls (2010)
Black Lungs/Cancer Bats Split EP(March 2011)
Pagan Holiday (2015)

Videography
 Hold Fast (Sink or Swim) (2008)
 For Her (2008)

References

External links
MySpace page 

Canadian punk rock groups
Dine Alone Records artists
Musical groups from St. Catharines
Musical groups established in 2005
2005 establishments in Ontario